
Karl Freiherr von Thüngen (26 June 1893 – 24 October 1944) was a German general in the Wehrmacht during World War II who was executed in 1944 after the failed 20 July Plot.

Biography

During World War II, Thüngen served on the Eastern Front, in 1942 and 1943 with the 18th Panzer Division. On 6 April 1943 he was awarded the Knight's Cross of the Iron Cross. On 20 July 1944, he was appointed by the conspirators as the commander of the defense group III (Berlin), succeeding the arrested General Joachim von Kortzfleisch. He did not follow the conspirators' orders and later took part in the interrogation of Major Hans-Ulrich von Oertzen, a supporter of the plot under his command.

He was nevertheless subsequently arrested by the Gestapo. He was dismissed from the army by the court of honor and was then tried by the People's Court, sentenced to death by Roland Freisler on 5 October 1944 and shot by firing squad in Brandenburg-Görden Prison on 24 October 1944.

Family
Karl Freiherr von Thüngen was the son of Karl Ernst Freiherr von Thüngen (1839–1927) and Eva Elisabeth Maier (born 1874). He was married twice. His first marriage took place on 11 February 1919 to Margit Edle von Schultes (dead 1932). On 5 April 1934 he married Marie Freiin von Michel-Raulino (1893–1978). Karl Freiherr Michel von Tüßling was her cousin.

Awards and decorations

 Iron Cross (1914)
 2nd Class
 1st Class
 German Cross in Gold (18 October 1941)
 Knight's Cross of the Iron Cross on 6 April 1943 as Generalleutnant and commander of 18. Panzer-Division

References

1893 births
1944 deaths
Barons of Germany
Lieutenant generals of the German Army (Wehrmacht)
People condemned by Nazi courts
Recipients of the Gold German Cross
Recipients of the Knight's Cross of the Iron Cross
Military personnel from Mainz
Executed members of the 20 July plot
People from Rhineland-Palatinate executed by Nazi Germany
Executed German people
People executed by Germany by firing squad
People from Rhenish Hesse